The 1989 Intercontinental Cup was an association football match played on 17 December 1989 between Milan of Italy, winners of the 1988–89 European Cup, and Atlético Nacional of Colombia, winners of the 1989 Copa Libertadores. The match was played at the neutral venue of the National Stadium in Tokyo in front of 60,228 fans. Alberico Evani was named as man of the match.

Match details

|valign="top" width="50%"|

|}

See also
1988–89 European Cup
1989 Copa Libertadores
A.C. Milan in European football
Atlético Nacional in international tournaments

References

External links
FIFA Article

Intercontinental Cup
Intercontinental Cup
Intercontinental Cup
Intercontinental Cup (football)
Intercontinental Cup 1989
Intercontinental Cup 1989
Intercontinental Cup (football) matches hosted by Japan
Inter
Inter
Sports competitions in Tokyo
December 1989 sports events in Asia
1989 in Tokyo
1989 in association football